The 2023 Campeonato Goiano (officially the GOIANÃO 1XBET 2023 for sponsorship reasons) is the 80th edition of Goiás's top professional football league organized by FGF. The competition began on 11 January and will end on 9 April 2023.

The competition will count with the participation of Inhumas and Goiânia (teams promoted from the 2022 Campeonato Goiano da Divisão de Acesso) that occupied the places of the 2022 relegated teams.

Atlético Goianiense are the defending champions.

Participating teams

Format
In the first stage, each team will play the other eleven teams in a single round-robin tournament. The teams will be ranked according to points. If tied on points, the following criteria will be used to determine the ranking: 1. Wins; 2. Goal difference; 3. Goals scored; 4. Head-to-head points (only between two teams) 5. Fewest red cards; 6. Fewest yellow cards; 7. Draw. This criteria (except 4) will also be used to determine the overall performance in the final stages. The top eight teams will advance to the quarter-finals while the bottom two teams will be relegated to 2024 Campeonato Goiano da Divisão de Acesso.

The final stages will be played on a home-and-away two-legged basis. For the semi-finals and finals the best overall performance team will host the second leg. If the score is level, a penalty shoot-out will be used to determine the winners.

Champions will qualify for the 2024 Copa do Brasil and 2024 Copa Verde, while runners-up and third place will qualify for the 2024 Copa do Brasil. Top three teams not already qualified for 2024 Série A, Série B or Série C qualified for 2024 Campeonato Brasileiro Série D.

First stage

Group A

Final stage

Bracket

Quarter-finals

|}

Group B

Goiás advanced to the semi-finals

Group C

Atlético Goianiense advanced to the semi-finals

Group D

Anápolis advance to the semi-finals

Group E

Aparecidense advanced to the semi-finals

Semi-finals

|}

Group F

Winners advance to the finals

Group G

Atlético Goianiense advanced to the finals

Finals

|}

Matches

References

Campeonato Goiano seasons
Goiano
2023 in Brazilian football